Igor Lotaryov (born 30 August 1964) is a Russian former Soviet male middle-distance runner who competed mainly in the 1500 metres. He set his lifetime best of 3:34.49 minutes for the event in Brussels in 1985.

He made his international debut as a junior athlete, running in the Soviet teams at the IAAF World Cross Country Championships in 1982 and 1983. He won his first international medal at the 1983 European Athletics Junior Championships, finishing second in the 1500 m behind East German Maik Dreissigacker.

He enjoyed senior success in the mid-1980s including bronze medals at the Friendship Games and 1985 IAAF World Cup, then a silver medal behind compatriot Pavel Yakovlev at the 1986 Goodwill Games. He was also a 1500 m finalist at the 1986 European Athletics Championships and the 1987 European Athletics Indoor Championships.

He set the first IAAF-recognised world indoor record for the 1000 metres event, running 2:18.00 on 14 February 1987. This stood for almost five years before being beaten by Rob Druppers of the Netherlands. As of 2017, his time remains in the top 40 of all-time.

Lotaryov was a three-time national champion, taking the indoor 1500 m title twice at the Soviet Indoor Athletics Championships (1984, 1987) and once outdoors at the Soviet Athletics Championships in 1985.

International competitions

National championships
Soviet Indoor Athletics Championships
1500 m: 1984, 1987
Soviet Athletics Championships
1500 : 1985

Notes
Alternative transliterations of his surname include Lotaryev, Lotarev, Lotorev, and a Lotoryev.

References

External links

Living people
1964 births
Soviet male middle-distance runners
Russian male middle-distance runners
World record setters in athletics (track and field)
Goodwill Games medalists in athletics
Competitors at the 1986 Goodwill Games
Friendship Games medalists in athletics